A meme is a term referring to a unit of cultural information transferable from one mind to another.

Meme, or MEME, may also refer to:

Places
 Meme (department), a division of the Southwest province in Cameroon
 Meme, Mingin, Burma

People
 Meme McDonald, Australian writer and theatre director
David Meme, English musician
 Mihai Stoica (also known as Meme Stoica), Romanian Football Club manager

Arts, entertainment, and media

Film and television
 Mīmu Iro Iro Yume no Tabi (The Many Dream Journeys of Meme), a 1983 science-themed educational anime television series starring a "meme" who inhabits computer networks
 Meme (film), an American independent drama

Games
 "Meme", the second expansion pack for the Metal Gear series of games

Internet and social media
 Internet meme, a meme or fad that spreads quickly through the Internet
 Yahoo! Meme, a microblogging site launched by Yahoo! Inc. in August 2009, similar to Twitter

Music
 Meme (band), an American indie pop group
 Meme (Milosh album), a 2006 album by Milosh
 Meme (Rurutia album), a 2005 album by Rurutia

Technology and measurement
 Multiple EM for Motif Elicitation (MEME), a motif discovery and search system in bioinformatics
 Teme (philosophy), technological-meme

Mythology
 Gborogboro and Meme, the first man and woman in Lugbara mythology
 Meme (Mesopotamian goddess), a minor Mesopotamian goddess

See also
 Image macro, a type of Internet meme commonly referred to as a "meme"
 Mneme (disambiguation)